The Rotunda of St. Catherine, known as the Znojmo Rotunda (Znojemská rotunda), is a Romanesque rotunda located in Znojmo, Czech Republic. It is the town's most valuable monument, and features one of the oldest fresco compositions in the Czech lands. Besides the religious motives, of particular importance is the praising portrayal of the ruling Přemyslid dynasty.

The building was originally a castle chapel, dedicated to Virgin Mary, built in the mid-11th century. The painting was commissioned by Konrad II of Znojmo on the occasion of his wedding with Mary (Marija), daughter of Uroš I of Serbia in 1134. Apart of the donor couple, Konrad and Mary, the identity of the other depicted members of the dynasty is disputed among the historians. With two exceptions being the Přemysl the Ploughman, the legendary ancestor of the dynasty, and Vratislaus I, the first King of Bohemia.

References

Sources

External links 
 The Ducal Rotunda of the Virgin Mary and St Catherine
 A Virtual Tour

Churches in Znojmo
Round churches
National Cultural Monuments of the Czech Republic
11th-century Roman Catholic church buildings